Smack(s) may refer to:

 Slapping (strike), a broad stroke made with the open hand
 Spanking, a form of corporal punishment
 Heroin, a narcotic drug
 Smack (ship), a small decked or half-decked vessel
 Smack talk, the use of threatening or intentionally inflammatory language
 A collective noun for a group of jellyfish
 An onomatopoetic word for a kiss
 Honey Smacks, a breakfast cereal sometimes marketed simply as Smacks

Computer software 
 Smack (software), a Linux kernel mandatory access control mechanism

Arts and entertainment 
 Smack (American band), a 2000s pop/rock band
 Smack (Finnish band), a 1980s rock band
 Smack (Brazilian band), a 1980s post-punk band
 Smack (novel) or Junk, a 1996 novel by Melvin Burgess
 "Smack", a song by Zion I and The Grouch, a B-side of the single "Lift Me Up"
 "Smack" or Smack White (b. Troy Mitchell) founder of Ultimate rap league

See also 
 
 Trash-talk